Burmeistera is a genus of flowering plants in the bellflower family, Campanulaceae. There are around 130 species distributed in Central and South America. This genus represents a rapid evolutionary radiation with species having diverged within only the last 2.6 million years.

These are herbs, shrubs, or lianas. Most have either green or yellow flowers with purple markings and inflated fruit pods.

The flowers of these plants are pollinated by bats, except for Burmeistera rubrosepala, which is pollinated by hummingbirds. Bats such as Anoura geoffroyi and Anoura caudifer visit the flowers for the nectar.

Species include:
 Burmeistera anderssonii
 Burmeistera asplundii
 Burmeistera auriculata
 Burmeistera brachyandra
 Burmeistera crispiloba
 Burmeistera cuyujensis
 Burmeistera cyclostigma
 Burmeistera cylindrocarpa
 Burmeistera domingensis
 Burmeistera formosa
 Burmeistera holm-nielsenii
 Burmeistera huacamayensis
 Burmeistera ignimontis
 Burmeistera loejtnantii
 Burmeistera microphylla
 Burmeistera oblongifolia
 Burmeistera oyacachensis
 Burmeistera parviflora
 Burmeistera racemiflora
 Burmeistera refracta
 Burmeistera resupinata
 Burmeistera rubrosepala
 Burmeistera sodiroana
 Burmeistera tenuiflora
 Burmeistera truncata

References

 
Campanulaceae genera
Taxonomy articles created by Polbot